USS Pitkin (AK-204) was an  that was constructed for the US Navy during the closing period of World War II. By the time she was scheduled for commissioning, the war’s end caused her to be declared “excess to needs” and she was returned to the US Government and struck by the Navy.

Construction
Pitkin was laid down under US Maritime Commission (MARCOM) contract, MC hull 2158, by Globe Shipbuilding Co., Superior, Wisconsin. She was transferred to the Navy in May 1945. Pitkin was scheduled for commissioning. However, because of the Allied victory in the Pacific Ocean theatre of operations, her commissioning was cancelled. Pitkin was ordered returned to MARCOM for disposal. Her name subsequently reverted to Coastal Observer.

Merchant service
Coastal Competitor was used by several shipping companies from 1945–1948, when she was placed in the reserve fleet.

On 13 July 1956, she was sold to Companhia Nacional de Navegacao Costerira, Patrimonio Nacional, of Brazil, for $693,682, under the condition that she be used for coastal shipping. She was delivered on 2 February 1957. She was broken up at Recife in 1984.

Notes 

Citations

Bibliography 

Online resources

External links

 

Alamosa-class cargo ships
Ships built in Superior, Wisconsin
1945 ships
World War II auxiliary ships of the United States
Pitkin County, Colorado